Pulimath  is a village in Thiruvananthapuram district in the state of Kerala, India.pulimath gramapanchayath situated in thiruvananthapuram district kerala.

Thaluk-chirayinkeezhu

Block- Kilimanoor

Demographics
 India census, Pulimath had a population of 22808 with 10677 males and 12131 females.

References

Villages in Thiruvananthapuram district